Vangara may refer to:
Vangara, Srikakulam, a village and mandal in the state of Andhra Pradesh, India
Vangara, Telangana, a village in the state of Telangana, India
Vangara Venkata Subbaiah, Telugu actor